is a former Japanese football player.

Club statistics

References

External links

J. League (#30)

1989 births
Living people
Osaka Gakuin University alumni
Association football people from Kanagawa Prefecture
Japanese footballers
J2 League players
Japan Football League players
FC Gifu players
SP Kyoto FC players
Association football defenders